Altha is a genus of moths of the family Limacodidae first described by Walker in 1862.

Description
Palpi short and slight. Mid and hind tibia lack spurs. Forewings with vein 7 from the cell or stalked with veins 8 and 9. Hindwing with vein 6 and 7 from the cell.

Species
Some species of this genus are:

Altha adala Moore, 1859
Altha alastor Tams, 1930 (from Sulawesi)
Altha ansorgei Bethune-Baker, 1911 (from Angola and Nigeria)
Altha basalis West, 1940 (from Congo and Tanzania)
Altha circumscripta Hering 1931
Altha contaminata Hampson, 1892
Altha lacides Hampson, 1910 (from Zambia)
Altha lacteola (Swinhoe, 1890) (from Taiwan and Vietnam)
Altha nivea Walker, 1862 (from India to Sundaland/Borneo)
Altha nix Solovyev & Witt, 2009 (from Laos, Thailand and Vietnam)
Altha nuristana Daniel 1865
Altha peralbida Swinhoe, 1904(from India)
Altha pura (from Indonesia)
Altha rufescens Swinhoe
Altha rubrifusalis Hampson, 1910 (from Ghana, Nigeria and Sierra Leone)
Altha subnotata Walker, 1865(from India, Sri Lanka)

References

Walker, 1862. Journal of the Proceedings of the Linnean Society: Zoology 6: 173
Encyclopedia of Life
A.V. Solovyev & T.J. Witt, "The Limacodidae of Vietnam", Entomofauna, 2009, Suppl 16, page 53.

Limacodidae genera
Limacodidae

Limacodinae